Health promotion is, as stated in the 1986 World Health Organization (WHO) Ottawa Charter for Health Promotion, the "process of enabling people to increase control over, and to improve their health."

Scope 
The WHO's 1986 Ottawa Charter for Health Promotion and then the 2005 Bangkok Charter for Health Promotion in a Globalized World defines health promotion as "the process of enabling people to increase control over their health and its determinants, and thereby improve their health".

Health promotion involves public policy that addresses health determinants such as income, housing, food security, employment, and quality working conditions. More recent work has used the term Health in All Policies (HiAP) to refer to the actions that incorporate health into all public policies. Health promotion is aligned with health equity and can be a focus of non-governmental organizations (NGOs) dedicated to social justice or human rights. Health literacy can be developed in schools, while aspects of health promotion such as breastfeeding promotion can depend on laws and rules of public spaces. One of the Ottawa Charter Health Promotion Action items is infusing prevention into all sectors of society, to that end, it is seen in preventive healthcare rather than a treatment and curative care focused medical model.

There is a tendency among some public health officials, governments, and the medical–industrial complex to reduce health promotion to just developing personal skills, also known as health education and social marketing focused on changing behavioral risk factors. However, recent evidence suggests that attitudes about public health policies are less about personal abilities or health messaging than about individuals' philosophical beliefs about morality, politics, and science.

History
This first publication of health promotion is from the 1974 Lalonde report from the Government of Canada, which contained a health promotion strategy "aimed at informing, influencing and assisting both individuals and organizations so that they will accept more responsibility and be more active in matters affecting mental and physical health".  Another predecessor of the definition was the 1979 Healthy People report of the Surgeon General of the United States, which noted that health promotion "seeks the development of community and individual measures which can help... [people] to develop lifestyles that can maintain and enhance the state of well-being".

At least two publications led to a "broad empowerment/environmental" definition of health promotion in the mid-1980s:
 In the year 1984 the WHO Regional Office for Europe defined health promotion as "the process of enabling people to increase control over, and to improve, their health". In addition to methods to change lifestyles, the WHO Regional Office advocated "legislation, fiscal measures, organizational change, community development and spontaneous local activities against health hazards" as health promotion methods.
 In 1986, Jake Epp, Canadian Minister of National Health and Welfare, released Achieving health for all: a framework for health promotion which also came to be known as the "Epp report". This report defined the three "mechanisms" of health promotion as "self-care"; "mutual aid, or the actions people take to help each other cope"; and "healthy environments".
 1st International Conference on Health Promotion, Ottawa, 1986, which resulted in the "Ottawa Charter for Health Promotion". According to the Ottawa Charter, health promotion:
 "is not just the responsibility of the health sector, but goes beyond healthy life-styles to well-being"
 "aims at making... [political, economic, social, cultural, environmental, behavioural and biological factors] favourable through advocacy for health"
 "focuses on achieving equity in health"
 "demands coordinated action by all concerned: by governments, by health and other social organizations."

The "American" definition of health promotion, first promulgated by the American Journal of Health Promotion in the late 1980s, focuses more on the delivery of services with a bio-behavioral approach rather than environmental support using a settings approach. Later the power on the environment over behavior was incorporated. The Health Promotion Glossary 2021 reinforces the international 1986 definition.

The WHO, in collaboration with other organizations, has subsequently co-sponsored international conferences including the 2015 Okanagan Charter on Health Promotion Universities and Colleges.

In November 2019, researchers reported, based on an international study of 27 countries, that caring for families is the main motivator for people worldwide.

Settings-Based Approach 
The WHO's settings approach to health promotion, Healthy Settings, looks at the settings as individual systems that link community participation, equity, empowerment, and partnership to actions that promote health. According to the WHO, a setting is "the place or social context in which people engage in daily activities in which environmental, organizational, and personal factors interact to affect health and wellbeing." There are 11 recognized settings in this approach: cities, villages, municipalities and communities, schools, workplaces, markets, homes, islands, hospitals, prisons, and universities.

Health Promoting Hospitals 
Health promotion in the hospital setting aims to increase health gain by supporting the health of patients, staff, and the community. This is achieved by integrating health promotion concepts, strategies, and values into the culture and organizational structure of the hospital. Specifically, this means setting up a management structure, involving medical and non-medical staff in health promotion communication, devising action plans for health promotion policies and projects, and measuring and measuring health outcomes and impact for staff, patients, and the community.

The International Network of Health Promoting Hospitals and Health Services is the official, international network for the promotion and dissemination of principles, standards, and recommendations for health promotion in the hospital and health services settings.

Workplace Setting

The process of health promotion works in all settings and sectors where people live, work, play and love. A common setting is the workplace. The focus of health on the work site is that of prevention and the intervention that reduces the health risks of the employee. The U.S. Public Health Service recently issued a report titled "Physical Activity and Health: A Report of the Surgeon General" which provides a comprehensive review of the available scientific evidence about the relationship between physical activity and an individual's health status. The report shows that over 60% of Americans are not regularly active and that 25% are not active at all. There is very strong evidence linking physical activity to numerous health improvements. Health promotion can be performed in various locations. Among the settings that have received special attention are the community, health care facilities, schools, and worksites. Worksite health promotion, also known by terms such as "workplace health promotion", has been defined as "the combined efforts of employers, employees and society to improve the health and well-being of people at work". WHO states that the workplace "has been established as one of the priority settings for health promotion into the 21st century" because it influences "physical, mental, economic and social well-being" and "offers an ideal setting and infrastructure to support the promotion of health of a large audience".

Worksite health promotion programs (also called "workplace health promotion programs", "worksite wellness programs", or "workplace wellness programs") include exercise, nutrition, smoking cessation and stress management.

According to the Centers for Disease Control and Prevention (CDC), "Regular physical activity is one of the most effective disease prevention behaviors." Physical activity programs reduce feelings of anxiety and depression, reduce obesity (especially when combined with an improved diet), reduce risk of chronic diseases including cardiovascular disease, high blood pressure, and type 2 diabetes; and finally improve stamina, strength, and energy.

Reviews and meta-analyses published between 2005 and 2008 that examined the scientific literature on worksite health promotion programs include the following:
 A review of 13 studies published through January 2004 showed "strong evidence... for an effect on dietary intake, inconclusive evidence for an effect on physical activity, and no evidence for an effect on health risk indicators".
 In the most recent of a series of updates to a review of "comprehensive health promotion and disease management programs at the worksite," Pelletier (2005) noted "positive clinical and cost outcomes" but also found declines in the number of relevant studies and their quality.
 A "meta-evaluation" of 56 studies published 1982–2005 found that worksite health promotion produced on average a decrease of 26.8% in sick leave absenteeism, a decrease of 26.1% in health costs, a decrease of 32% in workers’ compensation costs and disability management claims costs, and a cost-benefit ratio of 5.81.
 A meta-analysis of 46 studies published in 1970–2005 found moderate, statistically significant effects of work health promotion, especially exercise, on "work ability" and "overall well-being"; furthermore, "sickness absences seem to be reduced by activities promoting a healthy lifestyle".
 A meta-analysis of 22 studies published 1997–2007 determined that workplace health promotion interventions led to "small" reductions in depression and anxiety.
 A review of 119 studies suggested that successful work site health-promotion programs have attributes such as: assessing employees' health needs and tailoring programs to meet those needs; attaining high participation rates; promoting self care; targeting several health issues simultaneously; and offering different types of activities (e.g., group sessions as well as printed materials).

A study conducted by the World Health Organization and the International Labour Organization found that exposure to long working hours is the occupational risk factor with the largest attributable burden of disease, i.e. an estimated 745,000 fatalities from ischemic heart disease and stroke events in 2016. This landmark study established a new global policy argument and agenda for health promotion on psychosocial risk factors (including psychosocial stress) in the workplace setting.

Entities and projects by country
Worldwide, government agencies (such as health departments) and non-governmental organizations have substantial efforts in the area of health promotion. Some of these entities and projects are:

International and multinational
The WHO and its Regional Offices such as the Pan American Health Organization are influential in health promotion around the world. The main eight health promotion campaigns marked by WHO are World Health Day, World Tuberculosis Day, World Blood Donor Day, World Immunization Week, World Malaria Day, World No Tobacco Day, World Hepatitis Day and World AIDS Day. The WHO also reviews and endorses terminology including the Health Promotion Glossary 2021.

The International Union for Health Promotion and Education, based in France, holds international, regional, and national conferences.

The European Union is co-funding a Joint Action on Chronic Diseases and Healthy Ageing across the Life Cycle (JA-CHRODIS) with a strong focus on health promotion.

Australia
The Australian Health Promotion Association, a professional body, was incorporated in the year 1988. In November 2008, the National Health and Hospitals Reform Commission released a paper recommending a national health promotion agency. ACT Health of the Australian Capital Territory supports health promotion with funding and information dissemination.  The Victorian Health Promotion Foundation (VicHealth) from the state of Victoria is "the world's first health promotion foundation to be funded by a tax on tobacco." The Australian Government has come up with some initiatives to help Australians achieve a healthy lifestyle. These initiatives are:
 Get Set 4 Life - Habits for Healthy Kids
 The Stephanie Alexander Kitchen Garden National Program
 Healthy Spaces and Places
 Learning from Successful Community Obesity Initiative
 Healthy Weight information and resources.
Health Promotion is strong and well-established in Australia. Since 2008 there has been a number of graduate courses people can take to be involved within Health Promotion in Australia. The government since 2008 has included an initiative that involves the Aboriginal and Torres Strait Island citizens in the preventive health sector.

Health Promotion in Australian Schools 
School programs are based on curriculum documents from state and territorial councils. Schools mainly focus on health issues that are being supported by funding and special events. Funding for many health issues are the main basis for the school curriculum's subject of health.

Health Promotion for Aboriginal and Torres Strait Islander Citizens 
Aboriginal and Torres Strait Island citizens in Australia in the last couple of centuries have had poor health. The reason behind the poor health conditions is due to major events in the history of Australia. There is an increasing advancement in the promotion of health for Torres Strait Islander and Aboriginal citizens, but this cannot be achieved without the co-operation of non-indigenous Australians. For this health promotion to be a success, the citizens of Australia need to put the history between non-indigenous and indigenous citizens behind them and co-operate as equals.

Canada
The province of Ontario appointed a health promotion minister to lead its Ministry of Health Promotion in the year of 2005.

The Ministry's vision is to enable Ontarians to lead healthy, active lives and make the province a healthy, prosperous place to live, work, play, learn and visit. Ministry of Health Promotion sees that its fundamental goals are to promote and encourage Ontarians to make healthier choices at all ages and stages of life, to create healthy and supportive environments, lead the development of healthy public policy, and assist with embedding behaviours that promote health.

The Canadian Health Network was a "reliable, non-commercial source of online information about how to stay healthy and prevent disease" that was discontinued in 2007.

The BC Coalition for Health Promotion is "a grassroots, voluntary non-profit society dedicated to the advancement of health promotion in British Columbia".

Denmark
The Unit for Health Promotion Research has main focus points around the WHO Ottawa Charter. Research is one main focus and works to strengthen health within communities, enhance environments that support health and help individuals develop the skills they need to maintain health. Staff within the program with both Bachelors and Masters in Public Health, as well as other expertise such as: psychology, anthropology, biology, epidemiology, environmental health and more, helps add to the teaching experience. Having a diverse staff means increased knowledge in diverse communities as well as increased communication throughout varying socioeconomic groups. With the wide range of research, teaching, and a diverse staff, the goal of health promotion can be achieved more seamlessly.

India 
Sanitation was a key focus on health promotion in India. The National Urban Sanitation Policy 2008 was a development that promoted sanitation in urban areas of the country which focused on improving sanitation in community based organizations such as schools and open markets and to overall eliminate the practice of open defectation.

Ireland

Health Promotion Research in Ireland 
The Health Promotion Research Centre (HPRC) at the National University of Ireland Galway was established in 1990 with support from the Department of Health to conduct health promotion related research on issues relevant to health promotion in an Irish context. The Centre is unique in that it is the only designated research centre in Ireland dedicated to health promotion. It produces high quality research of national and international significance that supports the development of best practice and policy in the promotion of health. The Centre is a World Health Organization (WHO) Collaborating Centre for Health Promotion Research, has an active multidisciplinary research programme, and collaborates with regional, national and international agencies on the development and evaluation of health promotion interventions and strategies.

Objectives of the HPRC include:
 The generation and dissemination of health promotion research that is of national and international relevance.
 The translation of research that will lead to the development of healthy public policy and evidence-informed practice.
In 1997, another professional association was created, The Association for Health Promotion Ireland (AHPI). The AHPI operates independent of employers’ organizations and works to create opportunities for members to network and to provide them with support. The AHPI is particularly for those who work within or are interested in health promotion, and is the only professional organization that operates as such in Ireland.

New Zealand
The Health Promotion Forum (HPF) of New Zealand is the national umbrella organization of over 150 organisations committed to improving health. HPF has worked with The Cancer Society in order to produce a personal development plan for health promoters, which may be helpful to perform personal development reviews, to identify the competencies of individuals and to provide ideas for future development.

The Health Promotion Agency (HPA), formed July 1, 2012, is a Crown Agency established under the New Zealand Public Health and Disability Amendment Act 2012. Its board has been appointed by the Minister of Health. The work of HPA is divided into three main areas:
 Promoting the wellbeing and health of the community
 Enabling health promoting initiatives and environments
 Informing the public on health promoting policies and practices
HPA has a variety of programs based around many areas of work, including alcohol, immunisation, mental health, and skin cancer prevention. The agency aims to promote the wellbeing of individuals and encourage healthy lifestyles, prevent disease, illness and injury, enable environments that support health and wellbeing, and to reduce personal, economic and social harm.

Health Workforce New Zealand (HWNZ) is an organisation that is part of the National Health Board which provides national leadership on the development of the health workforce. Some health promotional programs supported by HWNZ include education and training initiatives, and the Voluntary Bonding Scheme, which rewards medical, midwifery and nursing graduates who agree to work in hard-to-staff communities, and sonography, medical physicist and radiation therapy graduates who stay in New Zealand.

Health promotion in New Zealand has become an established approach in addressing public problems since the 1980s, through increasing use of intersectoral action, the use of public policy and mass media as promotional strategies, and the increasing control Maori have taken over the provision and purchase of health promotion services. An example of health promotional initiatives is the action put in place to reduce childhood obesity in primary schools. Research was completed to identify the barriers to improving school food environments and promoting healthy nutrition in primary schools in New Zealand.

Considerable progress has also been made in the health impact assessment (HIA) research on the impact of policies on health in New Zealand. The approach has an important contribution to make in the strengthening of health and wellbeing in policymaking in New Zealand.

Norway 
In 2012, Norway created the Norwegian Public Health Act (PHA) in 2012. This act is based on policies of health equity, HiAP, sustainable development, the precautionary principle, knowledge-based approaches, and civil society participation. There is a strong focus on promoting health on the local level by giving decision-making power to the counties in order to decrease inequalities and increase a fair distribution of resources across all populations.

Sri Lanka
In 2015, the life expectancy of Sri Lankan people was 72 for male and 78 for female. The disease burden has started to shift towards non-communicable diseases related to lifestyle and environmental factors.  The 2012 estimated "healthy life expectancy" at birth of all Sri Lanka's population is 68 for females, 63 for males, and 65 overall.

The development of the Sri Lankan National Health Promotion Policy is related to the State Policy and Strategy for Health and the Health Master Plan 2007–2016. It emphasises advocacy and empowerment to enable individuals and communities to take control of their own health, as well as improving the management of health promotion interventions across sectors.

Sweden
In Sweden, on a national level, health promotion is primarily the responsibility of the Public Health Agency of Sweden. However, many regional initiatives exist, for example, within clinical health promotion programs in certain geographical areas. Health promotion is also highlighted by the Swedish National Board of Health and Welfare as the agency suggests this to be a component in health professionals' curriculum and training, which concerns, for example, Registered Nurses and Physicians.

Many health promotion initiatives in Sweden focus on health equity and thus focus on groups in society that have seen to be experiencing poorer health status. For example, a Swedish study suggest that health promotion interventions aiming at empowering adolescents in disadvantaged communities, should enable active learning activities, use visualizing tools to facilitate self-reflection, and allow the adolescents to influence the intervention activities. Health promotion in schools has grown because of the link between student health and well-being, so in order to help with their mental and physical health, health promotion has grown in school settings.

United Kingdom
The Royal Society for Public Health was formed in October 2008 by the merger of the Royal Society for the Promotion of Health (also known as the Royal Society of Health or RSH) and the Royal Institute of Public Health (RIPH).  Earlier, July 2005 saw the publication by the Department of Health and Welsh Assembly Government of Shaping the Future of Public Health: Promoting Health in the NHS. Following discussions with the Department of Health and Welsh Assembly Government officials, the Royal Society for Public Health and three national public health bodies agreed, in 2006, to work together to take forward the report's recommendations, working in partnership with other organisations. Accordingly:
 The Royal Society for Public Health (RSPH) leads and hosts the collaboration, and focuses on advocacy for health promotion and its workforce;
 The Institute of Health Promotion and Education (IHPE) works with the RSPH Royal Society for Public Health to give a voice to the workforce;
 The Faculty of Public Health (FPH) focuses on professional standards, education and training; and
 The UK Public Health Register (UKPHR) is responsible for the regulation of the workforce.

In Northern Ireland, the government's Health Promotion Agency for Northern Ireland was set up to "provide leadership, strategic direction and support, where possible, to all those involved in promoting health in Northern Ireland". The Health Promotion Agency for Northern Ireland was incorporated into the Public Health Agency for Northern Ireland in April 2009.

Recent work in the UK (Delphi consultation exercise due to be published late 2009 by Royal Society of Public Health and the National Social Marketing Centre) on the relationship between health promotion and social marketing has highlighted and reinforced the potential integrative nature of the approaches. While an independent review (NCC 'It's Our Health!' 2006) identified that some social marketing has in the past adopted a narrow or limited approach, the UK has increasingly taken a lead in the discussion and developed a much more integrative and strategic approach. This development adopts a holistic approach, integrating the learning from effective health promotion approaches with relevant learning from social marketing and other disciplines. A key finding from the Delphi consultation was the need to avoid unnecessary and arbitrary 'methods wars' and instead focus on the issue of 'utility'  and harnessing the potential of learning from multiple disciplines and sources. Such an approach is arguably how health promotion has developed over the years pulling in learning from different sectors and disciplines to enhance and develop.

United States
In the United States, one of the Ottawa Charter Health Promotion Actions, developing personal skills, is the core of Health Education and quite often Health education is confused for the whole of Health Promotion  Government agencies in the U.S. concerned with health promotion include the following:
 The Centers for Disease Control and Prevention has a Coordinating Center for Health Promotion whose mission is to "Prevent disease, improve health, and enhance human potential through evidence based interventions and research in maternal and child health, chronic disease, disabilities, genomics, and hereditary disorders".
 The National Institute for Occupational Safety and Health has developed Total Worker Health, a strategy incorporating elements of occupational safety and health and health promotion, to advance the health and well-being of employees.
 The United States Army Center for Health Promotion and Preventive Medicine "provide[s] worldwide technical support for implementing preventive medicine, public health, and health promotion/wellness services into all aspects of America's Army and the Army Community".

Nongovernmental organizations in the U.S. concerned with health promotion include:
 The Public Health Education and Health Promotion Section is an active component of the American Public Health Association.
 The National Commission for Health Education Credentialing offers the Certified Health Education Specialist and Master Certified Health Education Specialist examination, a competency-based tool used to measure possession, application and interpretation of knowledge in the Seven Areas of Responsibility for health education specialists. The exam reflects the entry-level sub-competencies of these areas of responsibility. In the 2020 Health Education and Promotion Terminology Report document health promotion is defined by Green & Kreuter  as "any planned combination of educational, political, regulatory, or organizational supports for actions and conditions of living conducive to the health of individuals, groups, and communities" This is an activity-based definition rather than the process-based definition from the foundational WHO Ottawa Charter for Health Promotion (1986) and dominate in everywhere except the US.
 The Wellness Council of America is an industry trade group that supports workplace health promotion programs.
 URAC (Utilization Review Accreditation Commission) accredits comprehensive wellness programs "that focus on health promotion, chronic disease prevention and health risk reduction".

See also

 Breastfeeding promotion
 Health 21
 Health for all
 Health marketing
 Health policy
 Health promoting hospitals
 Health promotion in higher education
 Preventive healthcare

References

Further reading

 
 
 
 
 
 
 
 
 
 
 
 
 Mittelmark, M;  Kickbusch, I;  Rootman, I; Scriven, A and Tones, K. (2008) Health Promotion Encyclopedia of Public Health. London:  Elsevier
 
 
 
 
 
 
 
 
  paperback .

External links

 
 Healthy Cities – WHO EURO Office
 Health-EU Portal Health Prevention and Promotion in the EU
 EuroHealthNet: The European Partnership for Improving Health, Equity and Well-Being